Jha or JHA may refer to:

Jha
 Jha (surname), a surname native to India and Nepal
 Jha (Indic), a glyph in the Brahmic family of scripts

JHA
 Job hazard analysis or job safety analysis
 Justice and Home Affairs, the former name for a pillar of the European Union
 Jacksonville Housing Authority, Florida, USA
 Japan Handball Association